Leptotrophon caroae is a species of sea snail, a marine gastropod mollusk in the family Muricidae, the murex snails or rock snails.

Description
The length of the shell attains 9.1 mm.

Distribution
This marine species occurs off New Caledonia.

References

 Houart, R., 1995. The Trophoninae (Gastropoda: Muricidae) of the New Caledonian region. Mémoires du Muséum national d'Histoire naturelle 167: 459–498

External links
 MNHN, Paris: holotype

Muricidae
Gastropods described in 1995